The Coronophoraceae are a family of fungi in the Ascomycota, order Coronophorales. The family was described by Austrian mycologist Franz Xaver Rudolf von Höhnel in 1907.

References

External links

Coronophorales
Ascomycota families
Taxa named by Franz Xaver Rudolf von Höhnel
Taxa described in 1907